CFCY may refer to:

 CFCY-FM, a radio station (95.1 FM) licensed to Charlottetown, Prince Edward Island, Canada
 CBCT (TV), a television station (channel 13) licensed to Charlottetown, Prince Edward Island, Canada, which held the call sign CFCY-TV from 1956 to 1968